Stuart Lyle Lafferty (born October 1, 1987) is an American actor. He is the younger brother of James Lafferty.

Early life
Lafferty was born in Hemet, California to Angelica and Jeffrey Lafferty, who own a local construction company. His older brother is actor James Lafferty. He attended Hemet High School, where he played basketball for the Bulldogs.

Career
He has modeled for stores such as Ocean Pacific, Champs Sports, and L.L. Bean and began performing in commercials at a young age. He has also appeared on One Tree Hill with his older brother in season 1 episode 22; "The Games That Play Us" and in season 2 episode 19; "I'm Wide Awake, It's Morning". Lafferty also appears alongside his brother in Kate Voegele's "Only Fooling Myself" music video and he played and served as a producer of the short film Hours Before.

Filmography

References

External links
 

1987 births
21st-century American male actors
Film producers from California
American male film actors
American male television actors
Basketball players from California
Living people
Male models from California
Male actors from California
People from Hemet, California